Lancea may refer to:
Lancea (weapon), the Roman auxiliaries' short javelin
Lancea (plant), a plant genus in the order Lamiales

See also
Lancia (disambiguation)